An electoral college is a set of electors who are selected to elect a candidate to particular offices. Often these represent different organizations, political parties or entities, with each organization, political party or entity represented by a particular number of electors or with votes weighted in a particular way.

Origins of electoral colleges

Early Germanic law stated that the German king led only with the support of his nobles.  Thus, Pelagius needed to be elected by his Visigothic nobles before becoming king of Asturias, and so did Pepin the Short by Frankish nobles in order to become the first Carolingian king.  While most other Germanic nations had developed a strictly hereditary system by the end of the first millennium, the Holy Roman Empire did not, and the King of the Romans, who would become, by papal coronation, Holy Roman Emperor or at least Emperor-elect, was elected by the college of prince-electors from the late Middle Ages until 1806 (the last election took place in 1792).

In the Church, both the clergy and laity elected the bishop or presiding presbyter. However, for various reasons, such as a desire to reduce the influence of the state or the laity in ecclesiastical matters, electoral power became restricted to the clergy and, in the case of the Church in the West, exclusively to a college of the canons of the cathedral church. In the Pope's case, the system of people and clergy was eventually replaced by a college of the important clergy of Rome, which eventually became known as the College of Cardinals. Since 1059, it has had exclusive authority over papal selection.

In the 19th century and beyond, it was usual in many countries that voters did not directly vote the members of parliament. In Prussia for example, in 1849–1918 the voters were Urwähler (original voters), appointing with their vote a Wahlmann (elector). The group of electors in a district elected the deputy for the Prussian House of Representatives. Such indirect suffrage was a means to steer the voting, to make sure that the electors were "able" persons. For electors, the requirements were usually higher than for the original voters. The left wing opposition was very much opposed to indirect suffrage. 

Even today in the Netherlands, the deputies of the First Chamber are elected by the provincial parliaments. Those provincial parliaments form the many electoral colleges for the First Chamber elections; the lists of candidates are national.

Modern electoral colleges

Countries with complex regional electorates may elect a head of state by means of an electoral college rather than a direct popular election.

Holy See 

In the sovereign Holy See, with the Vatican City as sovereign territory, the members of the College of Cardinals under the age of 80 elect the pope in a papal conclave. The pope being the chief executive of the Vatican, the election of the pope serves as the selection of the executive authority.

United States 

The United States Electoral College is an example of a system in which an executive president is indirectly elected, with electors representing the 50 states and the District of Columbia. The votes of the public determine electors, who formally choose the president through the electoral college. Each state has a number of electors equal to its Congressional representation (in both houses), with the non-state District of Columbia receiving the number it would have if it were a state, but in no case more than that of the least populous state. Under this system, all electors generally cast their votes for the winner of the popular vote in their respective states, except in Maine and Nebraska, where some electors cast votes for the winner of the state popular vote, and some cast their votes for the winner of the popular vote in Congressional Districts. However, there are several states where this is not required by law. In the United States, 270 electoral votes of the 538 electors are currently required to win the presidential election. If no candidate receives the required 270 electoral votes, the lower chamber of the United States' Congress, the House of Representatives, chooses the President, with each state delegation receiving one vote in this election by the Legislature. The Senate chooses the Vice President.

While the Electoral College was not controversial from its inception at the Constitutional Convention in 1787, up through the years immediately following the convention, it had become more controversial by the latter years of the 19th century, up through to the present day. More resolutions have been submitted to amend the Electoral College mechanism than any other part of the constitution.

There are five ways electoral college representatives are typically chosen: presidential nomination appointment; party nominee by appointment; gubernatorial appointments; state chair appointments; and hybrid methods for the elector selection.

State laws requiring electors to vote as directed are the subject of ongoing legal controversy. In 2020, the United States Supreme Court decided that, in Chiafalo v. Washington, those electors may be punished by law if they do not vote as directed.

France 

In France, an electoral college is particularly formed by the Grands électeurs consisting of local elected representatives (French departmental councillors, French regional councillors and French mayors). Since the beginning of the French Fifth Republic, these Grands électeurs are responsible for electing the senators. Prior to the 1962 French presidential election referendum, the President of the French Republic was elected indirectly by these Grands électeurs; prior to the adoption of the French Constitution of 1958, the President of France was elected by the French Parliament.

Worldwide 

"Colleges" of electors play a role in elections in other countries, albeit with electors allocated in ways differing from the United States. In Germany, the members of the federal parliament together with an equal number of people elected from the state parliaments constitute the Federal Convention, that exists for the only purpose of electing the (non-executive) head of state. Similarly, in India the members of both houses of parliament together with weighted votes from the members of the state legislative assemblies constitute an electoral college that elects the (non-executive) head of state. In Italy, the (non-executive) head of state is elected by the members of both houses of Parliament in joint session, together with delegates elected by the Regional Councils to ensure the representation of minorities.

Other countries with electoral college systems include Burundi, Estonia, Kazakhstan, Madagascar, Myanmar, Pakistan, Trinidad and Tobago and Vanuatu. The Seanad Éireann (Senate) in Ireland is chosen by an electoral college. Within China, both Macau and Hong Kong each have an Election Committee which functions as an electoral college for selecting the Chief Executive and for selecting some of the seats of the Legislative Council.  In Guernsey, an electoral college called the States of Election chooses the island's jurats. Georgia will have an electoral college to elect the President of Georgia beginning in 2024.

Ecclesiastical electoral colleges abound in modern times, especially among Protestant and Eastern Rite Catholic Churches. In the Eastern rite churches, all the bishops of an autocephalous church elect successor bishops, thus serving as an electoral college for all the episcopal sees.

Former electoral colleges

Historical examples of electoral colleges include Finland's, which elected the country's president from 1925 to 1988, exceptions are 1944 (exception law), 1946 (parliament) and 1973 (extended term by exception law). The electoral college was replaced by direct elections (consisting of two-round voting) since 1994.

During Brazil's military rule period, the president was elected by an electoral college comprising senators, deputies, state deputies, and lawmakers in the cities. The electoral college was replaced with a two-round system direct election in 1989, after the restoration of democracy.

Argentina had an electoral college established by its original 1853 Constitution, which was used to elect its president. The constitution was amended in 1949 by President Juan Perón and the electoral college was replaced with direct elections by popular vote used in the elections of 1951. After the Revolución Libertadora the 1957 reform repealed the 1949 Constitution and the electoral college was used again in the elections of 1958 and 1963.  The elections of March 1973 and September 1973 used direct elections by popular vote and a not used two-round system according to the Temporary Fundamental Statute enacted by the military junta in 1972. The elections of 1983 and 1989 used again the electoral college. The constitution was amended in 1994 and the electoral college was replaced with direct elections by popular vote, using a two-round system since 1995.

Paraguay had an electoral college that was established by the 1870 Constitution, which was used to elect its president. The constitution was replaced in 1940 and the electoral college was replaced with direct elections by popular vote since 1943.

Chile had an electoral college established by the 1828 Constitution, which was used to elect its president in the elections from 1829 to 1920. The constitution was amended in 1925 and the electoral college was replaced with direct elections by popular vote since 1925.

In France, the president was elected by the legislature from 1875 to 1954. The first presidential election of the Fifth Republic which elected Charles de Gaulle was the only presidential election where the winner was determined via an electoral college. The electoral college was replaced after the 1962 referendum, with direct elections by popular vote, using a Two-round system since 1965.

In Spain, during the Second Republic period (1931–1936–39) the President was elected by an electoral college comprising the Parliament members and an equal number of democratically elected members ("compromisarios").

The President of the Republic of China was elected by the National Assembly of the Republic of China from 1948 until 1996 when democratization resulted in direct elections. The National Assembly had the similar function of electoral college except it had the power to amend the Constitution. The People's Republic of China in the mainland today elects both the President and the Premier by the National People's Congress every five years similar to the National Assembly.

In South Korea, the President was elected by an electoral college under the dictatorships of the Fourth and Fifth Republics from 1972 until 1981 when democratization resulted in direct elections starting in 1987. Additionally, during the Fourth Republic, one-third of members of the National Assembly were nominally elected by the same electoral college which elected the President, though in practice they were appointed by the President.

In apartheid-era South Africa from 1961 to 1983, the State President of South Africa was appointed by an electoral college consisting of all the members of the House of Assembly of South Africa and the Senate of South Africa. Although after the adoption of the 1983 Constitution, transferring the position of State President from a legislative one to an executive one, the new House of Assembly, House of Representatives, and House of Delegates would designate 50, 25, and 13 of their members to the electoral college respectively. The electoral college would disappear along with the apartheid government, with the President of South Africa being elected by the South African Parliament in 1994, which is still the method of election to this day.

Another type of electoral college was used by the British Labour Party to choose its leader between 1983 and 2010. The college consisted of three sections: the votes of Labour MPs and MEPs; the votes of affiliated trade unions and socialist societies; and the votes of individual members of Constituency Labour Parties.

Early in United States history, state legislatures were essentially electoral colleges for both the U.S. Senate and even the federal Electoral College itself. Prior to 1913, U.S. state legislatures appointed U.S. senators from their respective states, and prior to 1872, U.S. presidential electors were in many cases chosen by state legislatures (though most states had switched to popular elections for electors by 1824). Because state legislatures had so much influence over federal elections, state legislative elections were frequently proxy votes for either the Senate or the presidency. The famed 1858 Lincoln–Douglas debates, reputedly held during a U.S. Senate campaign in Illinois, actually occurred during an election for the Illinois state legislature; neither Lincoln's nor Douglas' names appeared on any ballot. During the American Civil War, the Confederacy used an Electoral College that was functionally identical to that of the United States; it convened just once, in 1861, to elect Jefferson Davis as president.

References

External links

 "A Handbook of Electoral System Design" from International IDEA
 A New Nation Votes: American Election Returns 1787–1825

 
Elections